Wa East is one of the constituencies represented in the Parliament of Ghana. It elects one Member of Parliament (MP) by the first past the post system of election. Wa East is located in the Wa East District  of the Upper West Region of Ghana.

Boundaries
The seat is located within the Wa East District of the Upper West Region of Ghana.

Members of Parliament

Elections

See also
List of Ghana Parliament constituencies

References 

Parliamentary constituencies in the Upper West Region